The Battle of Winnepang occurred during Dummer's War when New England forces attacked Mi'kmaq at present day Jeddore Harbour, Nova Scotia. The naval battle was part of a campaign ordered by Governor Richard Philipps to retrieve over 82 New England prisoners taken by the Mi'kmaq in fishing vessels off the coast of Nova Scotia. The New England force was led by Ensign John Bradstreet and fishing Captain John Elliot.

Historical context 
Dummer's War occurred as a result of an expansion of British settlements along the Kennebec River (in present-day Maine) and of the movement of more New England fishermen into Nova Scotia waters (particularly at Canso, Nova Scotia). The Treaty of Utrecht (1713), which ended Queen Anne's War, had facilitated this expansion. The treaty, however, had been signed in Europe and had not involved any tribes of the Wabanaki Confederacy. None had been consulted and they protested through raids on British fishermen and settlements. In response to Wabanaki hostilities toward the expansion, the Governor of Nova Scotia Richard Philipps built a fort in traditional Mi'kmaq territory at Canso in 1720 and Massachusetts Governor Shute built forts on traditional Abenaki territory at the mouth of the Kennebec River. The construction of these fortifications raised tensions which in 1722 spilled into open warfare.

In July, the Abenaki and Mi'kmaq blockaded the capital of Nova Scotia Annapolis Royal in an attempt to starve it out. They captured 18 fishing vessels along with prisoners between present-day Cape Sable and Canso. They also captured vessels and took prisoners on the Bay of Fundy. One of the captured vessels had been dispatched from Canso to Annapolis Royal by Governor Philipps and contained a year supply of provisions for the capital. The Maliseet seized another vessel and used it to transport 45 warriors up the bay to join with 120 Mi'kmaq from Shubenacadie and Cape Sable in preparation to march against Annapolis Royal. In response, to protect the capital from native attack and secure the release of the New England prisoners, Lieutenant Governor John Doucett took 22 Mi'kmaq hostage at Annapolis Royal. Soon after the blockade began, Massachusetts Governor Shute declared war on the Wabanaki Confederacy. (Lieutenant Governor William Dummer, after whom the war is named, took the position of Acting Governor in 1723.)

Battle 
Immediately after the declaration of war, on July 22, Governor Philipps commissioned Capt. John Elliot and Capt. John Robinson in two sloops with regiments to protect the fishery at Canso and retrieve the New England prisoners. There was a Mi'kmaq camping place near Canso at present-day West Jeddore. There were thirty-nine natives at Winnepang (present-day Jeddore Harbour) who were holding prisoners in seven vessels. Captains Elliot and Bradstreet arrived in the harbour and attacked the natives in a two-hour naval battle. Bradstreet led a boarding party that overwhelmed the natives with hand grenades and disciplined fire. The New Englanders had five men killed and several injured, including a badly wounded Capt. Elliot.

As the Mi'kmaq tried to swim ashore to escape, the New Englanders opened fire on them. Thirty-five Natives were killed. The New Englanders managed to rescue fifteen prisoners from the vessels, while discovering that nine had been killed.

Only about five natives survived the battle, and when the bodies of the roughly thirty native casualties were recovered from the battle the New Englanders decapitated the corpses, setting the severed heads on spikes surrounding Canso's new fort.

Aftermath 
Elsewhere in the campaign to retrieve the New England prisoners, James Blinn negotiated a prisoner exchange at Canso and won the release of 24 fishermen. Blinn later kidnapped another three or four natives at Cape Sable Island.

In Captain Robinson's expedition, he captured ten of the vessels and killed three Abenaki. Robinson warned the Mi'kmaq not to harm the New England prisoners because they still had Mi'kmaq hostages at Annapolis Royal. He then arrived at Malagash harbour where the natives held five of the fishing vessels along with twenty prisoners. Robinson paid a ransom and they were released.

Captain Cyprian Southack killed one Mi'kmaq and took another five as prisoners off the Gut of Canso.

The Natives had sent sixteen prisoners to present-day Richibucto, New Brunswick.

References 
Notes

Citations

Bibliography 
 Dickason, Olive Patricia. Canada's First Nations: A History of Founding Peoples from Earliest Times. (See Dickason, "Louisbourg and the Indians", p. 77; Dickason, "La guerre navale des Micmacs contre les Britanniques", p. 244). Toronto: McClelland and Stewart, 1992.
 
 
 
 
 
 Penhallow's Indian Wars, p. 92
 Benjamin Church's account
 
 

Military history of Acadia
Military history of Nova Scotia
Military history of New England
Acadian history
Conflicts in Nova Scotia
Indigenous conflicts in Canada
Conflicts in 1722
Maritime history of Canada
Mi'kmaq in Canada